Miodrag Bajović (born 17 October 1959) is a Montenegrin former football manager and player.

Playing career
Between 1985 and 1990, Bajović spent five seasons at Partizan, making 98 appearances and scoring three goals in the Yugoslav First League.

Managerial career
After hanging up his boots, Bajović briefly served as manager at his former clubs Sutjeska Nikšić and Mogren.

Personal life
Bajović is the older brother of fellow footballer Milorad Bajović.

Honours
Partizan
 Yugoslav First League: 1985–86, 1986–87
 Yugoslav Cup: 1988–89
 Yugoslav Super Cup: 1989

References

External links
 

1959 births
Living people
Footballers from Nikšić
Yugoslav footballers
Montenegrin footballers
Association football defenders
FK Sutjeska Nikšić players
FK Mogren players
FK Partizan players
Yugoslav Second League players
Yugoslav First League players
Serbia and Montenegro football managers
Montenegrin football managers
FK Sutjeska Nikšić managers
FK Mogren managers